Ennigerloh is a town in the district of Warendorf, in North Rhine-Westphalia, Germany. It is situated approximately 25 km northeast of Hamm and 30 km southeast of Münster.

The town, located in an agricultural area and with a well-preserved medieval quarter, became more industrial in the 20th century as several cement factories were installed. Some of these closed towards the end of the century. Furniture manufacturing was also a significant industry.

Geography

Subdivisions 
 Enniger
 Westkirchen
 Ostenfelde

Notable people
 Alois Hanslian (born 1943), painter
 Willy Hartner (1905–1981), professor, founded the Institute for the History of Natural Sciences in Frankfurt am Main
 Karl Weierstrass (1815–1897), mathematician often described as "the father of analysis"

References

External links